Oblique Seville (born 16 March 2001) is a Jamaican sprinter.

Seville attended Calabar High School and is coached by Racers Track Club coach Glen Mills.
2019 was a breakthrough year for Seville: At the 2019 CARIFTA Games in George Town, Cayman Islands, he won the 100 metres in a time of 10.24s as well as the 4x100 metres relay. He also won the 100m at the Jamaican U20 Championships in Kingston in 10.13s. He also finished second in the 100m at the 2019 Pan American U20 Championships in San José, Costa Rica in 10.21s and won silver in the 4x100 metres relay.

The COVID-19 pandemic prevented him from competing for most of 2020 but Seville impressed again in April 2021 at the Jamaican Olympic Trials qualification, running the fastest 100m time. At the actual Jamaican Olympic trials in June 2021 for the delayed 2020 Summer Games, he was the fourth fastest with 10.10 seconds. In the final Seville finished third in the 100m behind Tyquendo Tracey, and Yohan Blake to secure his place at the Olympics.

References

External links

Living people
2001 births
Jamaican male sprinters
Athletes (track and field) at the 2020 Summer Olympics
Olympic athletes of Jamaica